Hymns/Spheres is a solo album by Keith Jarrett recorded at the Benedictine Abbey in Ottobeuren, Germany. The album consists of improvisations on the massive Karl Joseph Riepp "Trinity" Baroque pipe organ, "the larger of the two Karl Joseph Riepp (1710-1775) organs at the Benedictine Abbey in Ottobeuren". The original double-LP was released by ECM Records in November 1976, only three months after being recorded.

The liner notes on the album state "No overdubs, technical ornamentations or additions were utilized, only the pure sound of the organ in the abbey is heard.
Many of the unique effects, although never before used, were accomplished by pulling certain stops part way, while others remain completely open or closed.
Amazingly, baroque organs have always had this capability."

The original double vinyl album was not reissued on compact disc until 2013. There is also a CD (Spheres, ECM 1302) with a selection of tracks: Spheres (1st, 4th, 7th, 9th Movement).

In October 1980, Jarrett would return to the Ottobeuren Abbey to record Invocations on the same organ.

The 3rd movement was used in the movie Sorcerer.

Reception

In a review for AllMusic, Richard S. Ginell wrote: "Restlessly searching out new territory for improvisations, Keith Jarrett tackles the massive Karl Joseph Riepp "Trinity" Baroque pipe organ at the Benedictine Abbey in Ottobeuren, Germany... The devotee of Jarrett's piano will quickly discover that his organ idiom has nothing to do with his piano performances; he likes slow-moving, pulseless, sometimes dissonant, sometimes reverent or ecstatic smears of sound (which makes practical sense in the hugely reverberant churches where pipe organs are found). In the ninth movement, Jarrett can fool you into thinking that he is playing floating electronic space music (on an 18th-century organ!). Yet if one must apply a category, despite the improvisatory element, this double-LP is contemporary classical organ music, much closer to that of Olivier Messiaen than anything in the jazz world -- and only intermittently as striking."

Writing for All About Jazz, John Kelman commented: "Jarrett's solo improvisations have always possessed an inherent spirituality but, performed on baroque organ, rarely has it been so far to the fore. The two hymns are particularly majestic, and if Jarrett's reputation as a fearless improvisational explorer was already established by 1976, the many stops available on this baroque organ allowed him to experiment with sound as well, making Hymns/Spheres as wondrous sonically as it is a high point in the ongoing evolution of Jarrett's extemporaneous acumen." He concluded by calling the album "one of Jarrett's most significant recordings in its demonstration that, for this intrepid improviser, nothing is forbidden...and everything is possible."

Will Layman, in an article for PopMatters, stated: "Is it indulgent? Sure. But we're lucky to have this kind of indulgence from an artist as interesting as Keith Jarrett. Heard again, apart from all the egotism that seemed characteristic of Jarrett in 1976, Hymns/Spheres is daring and risky and fascinating. Not essential or even characteristic of Jarrett, except in showing that great artists tend to go beyond what's easy."

In an essay at Between Sound and Space, Tyran Grillo wrote: "Hymns/Spheres... documents an encounter with a grand Baroque organ that seems written in the stars... Trying to describe it is like painting every leaf on a tree: far easier to take a photograph and offer it in place of an inferior rendering... this music will never be complete. Its hints of infinity are overwhelming, and we are fortunate enough to know their touch in any form."

Track listing 
All music by Keith Jarrett 
CD #1
 "Hymn of Remembrance" – 4:02
 "Spheres (1st Movement)" – 7:40
 "Spheres (2nd Movement)" – 12:59
 "Spheres (3rd Movement)" – 10:13
 "Spheres (4th Movement)" – 12:20
CD #2
 "Spheres (5th Movement)" – 4:34
 "Spheres (6th Movement)" – 11:25
 "Spheres (7th Movement)" – 8:16
 "Spheres (8th Movement)" – 5:18
 "Spheres (9th Movement)" – 12:06
 "Hymn of Release" – 4:05

Personnel
 Keith Jarrett – pipe organ

Production
 Manfred Eicher - producter
 Martin Wieland - recording engineer
 Roberto Masotti - photography
 Barbara Wojirsch - cover design and layout

References

External links 

Keith Jarrett albums
1976 albums
Post-bop albums
ECM Records albums